Ivy-leaf morning glory is a common name for several plants and may refer to:

Ipomoea hederacea
Ipomoea hederifolia, native to the Americas

See also
Ipomoea nil, ivy morning glory